Francesco Rutelli (born 14 June 1954) is an Italian journalist and former politician, who is the president of Anica, National Association of Film and Audiovisual Industry, since October 2016.
He also chairs the "Centro per un Futuro Sostenibile" (Centre for a Sustainable Future – a bipartisan think tank on climate change and environmental issues). He was during 15 years co-president of the European Democratic Party, a centrist European political party and he is now President of the Institute of European Democrats, EDP political foundation. He has been Mayor of Rome 1994–2001, and president of the centrist party Democracy is Freedom – The Daisy 2002–2007. He was the Deputy Prime Minister and Minister of Culture and Tourism in the second cabinet of Prime Minister Romano Prodi 2006–2008. Currently he also chairs Priorità Cultura (Culture First); Incontro di Civiltà (Civilizations Meeting);  Videocittà, Moving Images Festival (Rome, 2018–2019).

Biography
Born in Rome, he entered politics joining the Radical Party, for which he was then elected secretary in 1980, aged 26. With the Radicals, Rutelli championed humanitarian and libertarian policies such as unilateral disarmament, abolition of nuclear power plants, conscientious objection to the compulsory national service, eradication of world hunger, decriminalisation of the use of cannabis. At those times the political action of the Italian Radicals was self-defined as inspired by the Gandhian non-violent movement.

First elected as deputy in 1983, confirming his office in 1987 and 1992, he then joined the Federation of the Greens in the late 1980s, becoming one of the party's leading figures, and developing new environmental campaigns.

He was then chosen as Ministry of Environment and Urban Areas in 1993, although he resigned after one day in the post. That same year, he was first elected Mayor of Rome as centre-left coalition candidate, defeating centre-right candidate Gianfranco Fini. Being reelected in 1997, with 985.000 popular votes, the highest in the history of the City, Rutelli held the position until 2001.

He also served as a Member of European Parliament from 1999 to 2004. There he's been committed to promote initiatives for the abolition of death penalty, freedom of information improvement and against corruption.
From the mid-1990s onwards his views appeared increasingly moderate.

Rutelli was defeated by Silvio Berlusconi in the 2001 general election as Prime Minister candidate for the centre-left Olive Tree coalition, gathering 16.4 million votes, against 16.9 million of the right wing coalition. He was also one of the founders of the Democrats, which became part of Democracy is Freedom – The Daisy. Rutelli led the party until it merged into the Democratic Party on 14 October 2007.

Francesco Rutelli's role in the Daisy — a party with strong ties with Italian Christian heritage — is considered by his opponents a singular upshot after a fairly erratic journey within Italian progressive politics, mainly because of his past social-libertarian and green experiences.

In 2006 he was named Deputy Prime Minister and Minister for Culture in the cabinet of Romano Prodi during Prodi's second term as Italian Prime Minister.

In February 2008 he announced his intention to run again as mayor of Rome leading a local centre-left coalition, but lost the local elections on 28 April 2008 against centre-right Gianni Alemanno.

In October 2009 he announced his intention to leave the Democratic Party. After leaving the Democratic Party, he co-founded the Alliance for Italy (ApI), a centrist, liberal party which ran joint lists with the Union of the Centre (UdC) in most regions in the regional elections of March 2010. In December 2010, the ApI became a founding member of the new centrist formation New Pole for Italy, and Rutelli became one of the new group's main leaders, along with UdC leader Pier Ferdinando Casini and Gianfranco Fini, the leader of the Future and Freedom party and former leader of the post-fascist Italian Social Movement and the national-conservative National Alliance, until 2012.

He has been again elected to the Camera dei Deputati in 2001 and 2006, and to the Senate in 2008, when he became the Chairman of COPASIR (Parliamentary Committee of Overview on Intelligence), where he drafted and published reports on human trafficking as a strategic threat, and the first Report to the Parliament and the Government on Cyberspace and its implications for national security.

International

Rutelli founded the European Democratic Party, together with the French political leader François Bayrou. He was unanimously voted co-president of the party (2004-2019). The members of the EDP in the European Parliament sit in the ALDE Group (Alliance of Democrats and Liberals) and then the Renew Group.
At the end of the 1990s he was member of the Committee of Regions, where he chaired the Urban Policies Committee, and was an Advisor for Urban Development to the former UN Secretary-General Boutros Boutros Ghali.

He is now the President of the political foundation affiliated to the EDP, the Institute of European Democrats.
 
He has been elected to the European Parliament (1999-2004), sitting in the ALDE Group, introducing Reports and many Parliamentary initiatives.
He has been one of the main promoter of the Referendum for a stronger integration between Italy and the EU (held in 1989, with an overwhelming YES vote – 88%); he has been awarded the Crocodile-Altiero Spinelli Prize, as a proEuropean personality.

Serving in the Italian Parliament, he has been member of the Foreign Affairs Committee. He also chaired for two terms the Human Rights Committee in the Camera dei Deputati.
 
He got a Diploma in International Organizations from the Italian Society for International Organization, SIOI. He also has been the Honorary President (2013-2014) of the Institute for Cultural Diplomacy (Berlin).
He promoted the "Cultural and Creative Industries Italy-China " Forums (Beijing, 2014; Milan, Venice, 2015). He co-chaired (2015) the Silk Road Cities Alliance (Beijing).

Rutelli quit University in 1977; 40 years later, at the age of 62, a degree in Landscape and environmental planning and design, with highest grade and honors by Università La Sapienza and Tuscia University.

Culture

His family has ancestral ties with culture and the arts, rooted in the regions of Marche, Emilia, Sicily and Rome.
 
Mario Rutelli (his great-grandfather) was the author of the Najadi Fountain in Rome (1901), the Anita Garibaldi's Monument, and dozens of public and private sculptures; among them, some of the most important monuments in Palermo (Sicily). Another great-grandfather, Felice Martini from Parma, was the Architect of the latest renovation (1873) of the historic Arsenale in Venice. Grandfather Ottavio Marini was the Director of Antiquities and Belle Arti of the Italian Government (1910s-1920s). The Rutelli family, in Palermo, is associated to many relevant developments: the construction of Teatro Massimo, the buildings in via Roma and on the seaside, Mondello's liberty buildings.

In the last twenty years, as Mayor of Rome and, furtherly, as Minister of Culture, Francesco Rutelli has contributed to the creation and development of many crucial infrastructures, cultural institutions, museums and galleries in Italy. 
Among them, the Auditorium-Città della Musica (an institution awaited in Rome for 60 years, designed by Renzo Piano), the MAXXI Museum, the new Ara Pacis shrine/museum, a vast restoration and archeological excavation program and the opening of over 20 museums and exhibition spaces in Rome, including the National Gallery of Ancient Art, the Civic Gallery of Modern Art (later renamed MACRO) and the Scuderie del Quirinale complex. He oversaw the restoration of San Carlo Theatre (Naples) and Petruzzelli Theatre (Bari), the construction of the new Maggio Fiorentino Auditorium (Florence), the radical restructuring of Museo Archeologico di Reggio Calabria and the conclusion of the Reggia di Venaria (Torino) restoration. 
He enacted a new Landscape Code and a new tax credit/tax shelter system that revitalized the movie industry. He established the Teatro Festival in Naples and re-launched the International Festival of Spoleto. He promoted the first (and only) White Book on Italian creative industries.
 
Francesco Rutelli led a significant Cultural Diplomacy strategy for Italy, and through successful negotiations managed the recovery of priceless stolen crafts and historical masterpieces, in the UNESCO Conventions framework, in cooperation with international museums and cultural institutions, developing new agreements on lending policies and scientific cooperation. Currently, he is the founder and President of Associazione Priorità Cultura, that gathers outstanding Italian personalities, engaged on Heritage conservation and promotion, contemporary arts, public-private partnership in the many fields of Culture.
 
In 2016, Olivetti Company, owned by TIM-Telecom, asked Francesco Rutelli to chair the Olivetti Design Contest, devoted to award young Italian designers.

He is President of ANICA (Italian Association of Cinema, Audiovisual and Multimedia Companies), elected in 2016, unanimously re-elected for the 2020–2022 term, and ANICA Servizi. Legal representative of MIA (Italian Audiovisual Market).

Miscellaneous
Rutelli is a supporter of Roman football club S.S. Lazio.
Married to Barbara Palombelli, a radio (Rai Radio 2) and television journalist for the Italian broadcasting company Mediaset ; they have four children, 3 of which are adopted.
Rutelli is the great-grandson of Italian sculptor Mario Rutelli.

Electoral history

References

External links
Official website
Personal Page in the Italian Parliament web site

1954 births
Living people
Politicians from Rome
Radical Party (Italy) politicians
Rainbow Greens politicians
Federation of the Greens politicians
The Democrats (Italy) politicians
Democracy is Freedom – The Daisy politicians
Democratic Party (Italy) politicians
Alliance for Italy politicians
Deputy Prime Ministers of Italy
Environment ministers of Italy
Culture ministers of Italy
Deputies of Legislature IX of Italy
Deputies of Legislature X of Italy
Deputies of Legislature XI of Italy
Deputies of Legislature XIV of Italy
Deputies of Legislature XV of Italy
Senators of Legislature XVI of Italy
Mayors of Rome
European Democratic Party
MEPs for Italy 1999–2004
Sapienza University of Rome alumni
Honorary Knights Commander of the Order of the British Empire